Emanuel Haldeman-Julius (né Emanuel Julius) (July 30, 1889 – July 31, 1951) was a Jewish-American socialist writer, atheist thinker, social reformer and publisher. He is best remembered as the head of Haldeman-Julius Publications, the creator of a series of pamphlets known as "Little Blue Books," total sales of which ran into the hundreds of millions of copies.

Biography

Early years

Emanuel Julius was born July 30, 1889, in Philadelphia, Pennsylvania, the son of David Julius (né Zolajefsky), a bookbinder. His parents were Jewish emigrants who fled Odessa (then part of the Russian Empire) and emigrated to America to escape religious persecution. His paternal and maternal grandfathers had both been rabbis but his own parents were not religious. "[T]hey were indifferent, for which I thank them."

As a boy, Emanuel read voraciously. Literature and pamphlets produced by the socialists were inexpensive; Julius read them and was convinced by their arguments. As he put it in 1913, "Only four years ago, I was a factory hand — slaving away in a textile mill in Philadelphia. I came upon the philosophy of Socialism and it put a new spirit into me. It lifted me out of the depths and pointed the way to something higher. I commenced to crave for expression. I felt that I have something to say. So, I scribbled things down. And, to my surprise, Socialist editors gave me a little encouragement." He joined the Socialist Party before World War I and was the party's 1932 Senatorial candidate for the state of Kansas.

Career

After working for various newspapers, Julius rose to particular prominence as an editor (1915-1922) of the Appeal to Reason, a socialist newspaper with a large but declining national circulation.  He and his first wife, Marcet Haldeman (whose last name he adopted in hyphenate), purchased the Appeal's printing operation in Girard, Kansas and began printing  pocket books on cheap pulp paper (similar to that used in pulp magazines), stapled in paper cover. These were first were called The Appeal's Pocket Series and sold in 1919 for 25 cents. The covers were either red or yellow. Over the next several years Haldeman-Julius changed the name successively to The People's Pocket Series, Appeal Pocket Series, Ten Cent Pocket Series, Five Cent Pocket Series, Pocket Series and finally in 1923, Little Blue Books. The five cent price of the books remained in place for many years. Many titles of classic literature were given lurid titles in order to increase sales. Eventually, millions of copies per year were sold in the late 1920s.

In 1922 they renamed the Appeal as The Haldeman-Julius Weekly (known from 1929 to 1951 as The American Freeman), which became the house organ. In 1924 they launched The Haldeman-Julius Monthly (later renamed The Debunker), which had a greater emphasis on Freethought, and in 1932 added The Militant Atheist, among other journals.

The novelist Louis L’Amour (1908-1988) described the Haldeman-Julius publications in his autobiography and their potential influence:
Riding a freight train out of El Paso, I had my first contact with the Little Blue Books. Another hobo was reading one, and when he finished he gave it to me. The Little Blue Books were a godsend to wandering men and no doubt to many others. Published in Girard, Kansas, by Haldeman-Julius, they were slightly larger than a playing card and had sky-blue paper covers with heavy black print titles. I believe there were something more than three thousand titles in all and they were sold on newsstands for 5 or 10 cents each. Often in the years following, I carried ten or fifteen of them in my pockets, reading when I could.

Among the books available were the plays of Shakespeare, collections of short stories by De Maupassant, Poe, Jack London, Gogol, Gorky, Kipling, Gautier, Henry James, and Balzac. There were collections of essays by Voltaire, Emerson, and Charles Lamb, among others. There were books on the history of music and architecture, painting, the principles of electricity; and, generally speaking, the books offered a wide range of literature and ideas. […] In subsequent years I read several hundred of the Little Blue Books, including books by Tom Paine, Charles Darwin, and Thomas Huxley.

Personal life, death and legacy

The couple had two children: Alice Haldeman-Julius Deloach (1917–1991) and Henry Haldeman-Julius (1919–1990;  he later changed his name to Henry Julius Haldeman). They adopted Josephine Haldeman-Julius Roselle (b. 1910).  Marcet and Emanuel legally separated in 1933. Marcet died in 1941, and a year later Haldeman-Julius married Susan Haney, an employee.

In June 1951  Haldeman-Julius was found guilty of income tax evasion by a Federal grand jury and sentenced to six months in Federal prison and fined $12,500. The next month he drowned in his swimming pool. His son Henry took over his father's publishing efforts, and the books continued to be sold until the printing house burned down on July 4, 1978.

Haldeman-Julius's papers are held at Pittsburg State University in Pittsburg, Kansas, a few miles from Girard in the southeastern corner of the state, as well as at the University of Illinois at Chicago, Indiana University and California State University, Northridge.

Selected works

"Mark Twain: Radical." International Socialist Review, vol. 11.2 (Aug., 1910), pp. 83–88. Emanuel's first bylined article.
 Dust (with Marcet Haldeman-Julius). New York: Brentano's, 1921.
 Studies in Rationalism. Girard, KS: Haldeman-Julius Publications, 1925.
 The Militant Agnostic. Amherst, NY: Prometheus, 1995 [1926].
 My First Twenty-Five Years. Girard, KS: Haldeman-Julius Publications, 1949.
 My Second Twenty-Five Years. Girard, KS: Haldeman-Julius Publications, 1949.
 The World of Haldeman-Julius (compiled Albert Mordell). New York: Twayne, 1960.
 Short Works (with Marcet Haldeman-Julius). Topeka: Center for Kansas Studies, Washburn University, 1992.

Footnotes

Further reading

 Bradford, Roderick. Video clip on Haldeman-Julius from the film American Freethought (Council for Secular Humanism, 2013). 
 Brown, Melanie Ann. Five-Cent Culture at the "University in Print": Radical Ideology and the Marketplace in E. Haldeman-Julius's Little Blue Books, 1919-1929 (diss., Univ. Minnesota, 2006; see here).
 Burnett, Betty. "Haldeman-Julius, Emanuel." American National Biography (edd. John A. Garraty and Mark C. Carnes). New York: OUP, 1999. Vol. 9.
 Cothran, Andrew. "The Little Blue Book Man and the Big American Parade" (diss., Univ. of Maryland, 1966).
 Davenport, Tim. "The Appeal to Reason: Forerunner of Haldeman-Julius Publications", Big Blue Newsletter no. 3 (2004).
 Fielding, William J. "Prince of Pamphleteers." The Nation, 10 May 1952, pp. 452–453.
 Gaylor, Annie Laurie. "E. Haldeman-Julius" at Freedom from Religion Foundation.
 Gunn, John W. E. Haldeman-Julius: The Man and His Work (LBB no. 678). Girard: 1924.
 Haldeman-Julius, Emanuel. Books by, about, or published by H-J at the Internet Archive.
 Haldeman-Julius, Sue. "An Intimate Look at Emanuel Haldeman-Julius." The Little Balkans Review, vol. 2.2 (Winter 1981–82), pp. 1–19. By his second wife.
 Haldeman-Julius.org, Haldeman-Julius Family Tree.
 Herder, Dale M. "Haldeman-Julius, The Little Blue Books, and the Theory of Popular Culture." Journal of Popular Culture, vol. 4.4 (Spring 1971), pp. 881–891.
 Herrada, Julie. "Emanuel Haldeman-Julius" in The New Encyclopedia of Unbelief (ed. Tom Flynn), pp. 374–376.
 Jacoby, Susan. Freethinkers: A History of American Secularism. New York: Henry Holt, 2004.
 Lee, R. Alton. Publisher for the Masses: Emanuel Haldeman-Julius. Lincoln, NE: University of Nebraska Press, 2017.
 Leinwand, Gerald. 1927: High Tide of the Twenties. NYC: Four Walls Eight Windows, 2001. pp. 293–297 (excerpts).
 Mordell, Albert. Trailing E. Haldeman-Julius in Philadelphia and Other Places (ed. E. Haldeman-Julius). Girard: Haldeman-Julius, 1949.
 Mordell, Albert. "Culture Salesman from Girard." The Brooklyn Jewish Center Review, vol. 33.12 (Nov. 1951), pp. 5–10.
 Potts, Rolf. "The Henry Ford of Literature." The Believer, vol. 6.7 (Sept. 2008).
 Ryan, William F. "Bertrand Russell and Haldeman-Julius: making readers rational." Russell, nos. 29-32 (1978), pp. 53–64.
 Scott, Mark. "The Little Blue Books in the War on Bigotry and Bunk." Kansas History, vol. 1.3 (Fall 1978), pp. 155–176.
 Victor, Jane. "Emanuel Haldeman-Julius: The Paper Giant" (Pittsburg State Axe Library).
 Wagner, Rob Leicester. "Hollywood Bohemia: The Roots of Progressive Politics in Rob Wagner's Script." Santa Maria, CA: Janaway Publishing, 2016
 White, Kevin. The First Sexual Revolution: The Emergence of Male Heterosexuality in Modern America. NYC: New York Univ. Press, 1993.
 Whitehead, Fred and Verle Muhrer (edd.). Freethought on the American Frontier. Amherst, NY: Prometheus, 1992.

External links

 
 
Finding aid to the E. Julius-Haldeman pocket books at Columbia University. Rare Book & Manuscript Library.
Little Blue Books Bibliography, by Jake Gibbs
Haldeman-Julius "Little Blue Book" Collection at the Amherst College Archives & Special Collections

1889 births
1951 deaths
20th-century American essayists
20th-century American male writers
20th-century American non-fiction writers
20th-century atheists
Accidental deaths in Kansas
American anti-capitalists
American atheism activists
Jewish American atheists
American male essayists
American male non-fiction writers
American people of Jewish descent
American social commentators
American social reformers
American socialists
Critics of Christianity
Deaths by drowning in the United States
Freethought writers
Jewish socialists
Kansas socialists
Pamphleteers
People from Girard, Kansas
Rationalists
Writers about activism and social change
Writers from Kansas
Writers from Philadelphia